Genoplesium cranei, commonly known as the Blackall Range midge orchid, is a small terrestrial orchid endemic to the Blackall Range in Queensland. It has a single thin leaf fused to the flowering stem and up to twenty small, green to greenish yellow flowers with reddish markings. It grows in open forest with shrubs and grasses.

Description
The flowers project forwards away from the flowering stem. The flowers are inverted so that the labellum is above the column rather than below it. There is a small callus in the centre of the labellum. Flowering occurs in February and March.

Taxonomy and naming
Genoplesium cranei was first formally described in 2000 by David Jones from a specimen collected in the Mapleton State Forest in the Blackall and the description was published in The Orchadian. In 2002, David Jones and Mark Clements changed the name to Corunastylis cranei but the change is not accepted by the Australian Plant Census. The specific epithet (cranei) honours the collector of the type specimen.

Distribution and habitat
Genoplesium cranei grows with shrubs and grasses in shallow, stony soil in open forest in the Blackall Range.

References

cranei
Endemic orchids of Australia
Orchids of Queensland
Plants described in 2000